Koerberia is a genus of lichen-forming fungi in the family Koerberiaceae.

The genus name of Koerberia is in honour of Gustav Wilhelm Körber (1817–1885), who was a German lichenologist.

The genus was circumscribed by Abramo Bartolommeo Massalongo in Geneacaena vol.4 on page 6 in 1854.

References

Peltigerales
Lichen genera
Peltigerales genera
Taxa named by Abramo Bartolommeo Massalongo
Taxa described in 1854